Harry Pilcer (April 29, 1885January 14, 1961) was an American actor, dancer, choreographer, and lyricist.

Biography
Pilcer is mainly remembered for his association with French dancer and singer Gaby Deslys who may have been his wife. According to Fred Astaire's autobiography, Pilcer was a fellow student at Claude Alvienne's stage dancing and dramatic school in New York in 1905. Pilcer and Deslys appeared in four Broadway musicals together Vera Violetta (1911), The Honeymoon Express (1913), The Belle of Bond Street (1914) and Stop Look! Listen! (1916). He composed Deslys's waltz The Gaby Glide. As a dance team Pilcer and Deslys were contemporaries to Vernon and Irene Castle, Florence Walton and "Maurice", Dorothy Dickson and husband Carl Hyson, and Genevieve Lyon and her husband John Murray Anderson. Pilcer and Deslys would probably have been the top dance team in both America and Europe had not World War I intervened and Deslys's death during the influenza pandemic in 1920. Pilcer also danced with Mistinguett and Teddy Bernard. After 1922 Pilcer ran a school of dancing in Paris. Pilcer co-starred with Deslys in her 1915 silent film Her Triumph (1915).

Pilcer died at Cannes of a heart attack January 14, 1961.

Filmography
Her Triumph (1915)
Bouclette aka Infatuation (1918)
Le Dieu du hasard (1921)
Distress (1929)
An Ideal Woman (1929)
Thank Your Lucky Stars (1943)
The Razor's Edge (1946)

References

External links

 
 
Pilcer, 1908 portrait (University of Washington, Sayre)
Harry Pilcer and Gaby Desly, early in their teaming (probably taken in Europe)
Pilcer in his heyday
Harry Pilcer, 1920
Photo of Pilcer in later years, appeared in his obituaries
 newsreel of Pilcer greeting friend Roscoe Arbuckle to London, 1920 *time marks 2:19 and 8:26
portrait
 Roscoe Fatty Arbuckle in London (1920..)(British Pathe)

1885 births
1961 deaths
American lyricists
American choreographers
Male actors from New York City